U.S. Route 64 (US 64) is a U.S. Numbered Highway that runs from the Four Corners area in Arizona to the east coast of North Carolina. In Arizona, the highway starts at U.S. Route 160 (US 160) heading southeast for  before entering New Mexico near the town of Beclabito. Through New Mexico the highway passes through Shiprock, Bloomfield, Tierra Amarilla and Tres Piedras, sharing a short concurrency with I-25 near Raton, before heading east through Clayton to the Oklahoma state line.

Route description
U.S. Route 64 (US 64) starts at an intersection with US 160 at Teec Nos Pos on the Navajo Nation. The highway then heads southeast passing an intersection with Bureau of Indian Affairs Route 5028 (BIA 5028) at the edge of town across the highway from the Teec Nos Pos Trading Post. The highway then cuts through a mesa before making a slight curve south by southeast. Past the mesa, US 64 passes through sparse ranch land, intersecting BIA 5111 before turning slightly eastward. After passing an intersection with BIA 5113, US 64 crosses the New Mexico state line.

Entering from Arizona, US 64 continues into the town of Beclabito, traveling to Shiprock. US 64 continues east into the city of Farmington, where it is multiplexed with unsigned State Road 5001 between junctions with US 64 Business. Then it passes through Bloomfield, followed by the towns of Blanco and Navajo City. After entering the Rocky Mountains, US 64 has a concurrency with US 84 from Chromo Mountain to Tierra Amarilla.

The highway then passes through Tres Piedras before crossing via the Rio Grande Gorge Bridge and heading into Taos. US 64 continues through the towns of Eagle Nest and Cimarron before eventually reaching I-25. The two highways bring up a short concurrency before US 64 turns northwest off of I-25 in Raton, then continuing to travel east, this time bringing up a concurrency with US 87 through the towns of Capulin, Des Moines, Grenville, and Mount Dora. The two highways split in Clayton, and US 64 forms another new concurrency with US 56 and US 412. The three highways barely touch the Texas Panhandle before continuing into Oklahoma.

History
When originally designated on November 11, 1926, U.S. Route 64 (US 64) had its western terminus at US 385 in Capulin, New Mexico. In 1933, US 64 had been extended to end at US 85 in Santa Fe, New Mexico, replacing all of the previously designated US 485 between Raton and Santa Fe, through Taos. On November 11, 1972, US 64 was truncated from Santa Fe to Taos, then extended west through Tres Piedras, Brazos, Monero and Bloomfield to US 550 in Farmington. The new routing replaced all of New Mexico State Road 111 (NM 111) and NM 553 between Taos and Tierra Amarilla. US 64 then replaced all of NM 17 between US 84 and US 550 in Farmington. On December 2, 1988, or sometime after that date, US 64 was further extended over Arizona State Route 504 and New Mexico State Road 504 to a junction with US 160 in Teec Nos Pos, Arizona near Four Corners. Today, the western terminus of US 64 remains at Teec Nos Pos.

New Mexico State Road 5001

State Road 5001 (NM 5001) is an unsigned  state highway in New Mexico. For its entire length, NM 5001 is multiplexed with US 64, and is also known as Murray Drive. NM 5001's western terminus is at US 64 Bus. (Main Street) in Farmington, and the eastern terminus is at US 64 Bus. (Broadway Avenue) in Farmington. NM 5001 is one of only three four-digit state highways in New Mexico (the others being NM 1113 and NM 6563).

Future
Several plans involve safety improvements in US 64 at its intersection with NM 68.

Junction list

Related route

Farmington business loop

U.S. Route 64 Business (US 64 Bus.) goes through downtown Farmington, via Main Street and Broadway Avenue.  Mainline US 64 is signed as both Bypass and Truck route, going south around Farmington, via Murray Drive.

References

External links

 Arizona
64
64
Transportation in Apache County, Arizona
Transportation in San Juan County, New Mexico
Transportation in Rio Arriba County, New Mexico
Transportation in Taos County, New Mexico
Transportation in Colfax County, New Mexico
Transportation in Union County, New Mexico